The Queensland Railways C13 Baldwin class locomotive was a class of 2-8-0 steam locomotives operated by the Queensland Railways.

History
In 1879, the Baldwin Locomotive Works delivered two 2-8-0 to the Queensland Railways’ Southern & Western Railway. Per Queensland Railway's classification system they were designated the C13 class, C representing they had four driving axles, and the 13 the cylinder diameter in inches.

Class list

References

Baldwin locomotives
Railway locomotives introduced in 1879
C13
2-8-0 locomotives
3 ft 6 in gauge locomotives of Australia